The Berkeley Hills are a range of the Pacific Coast Ranges that overlook the northeast side of the valley that encompasses San Francisco Bay.  They were previously called the "Contra Costa Range/Hills" (from the original Spanish Sierra de la Contra Costa), but with the establishment of Berkeley and the University of California, the current usage was applied by geographers and gazetteers.

Geology

The Berkeley Hills are bounded by the major Hayward Fault along their western base, and the minor Wildcat fault on their eastern side.  The highest peaks are Grizzly Peak (elevation 1,754 feet/535 m) and Round Top (elevation 1,761 feet/537 m), an extinct volcano, and William Rust Summit 1,004 feet (306 m).

Vollmer Peak (elevation 1,905 feet/581 m), although commonly thought to be part of the Berkeley Hills, is actually located on the adjacent San Pablo Ridge near the point where it meets the Berkeley Hills at the head of Wildcat Canyon.  Vollmer Peak was named in honor of the first police chief of the City of Berkeley, August Vollmer.  It was formerly known as "Bald Peak", and as "Rocky Mound" in the 19th century.

Development

Much of the west slope of the Berkeley Hills has residential neighborhoods of mostly single family homes, except on the land of University of California, Berkeley.  Most streets are narrow and tend to follow the contours of the land, although three streets, Marin Avenue, Moeser Lane, and Potrero Avenue, run directly toward the ridgeline.  Other roads to the ridgeline wind their way up the canyons. Grizzly Peak and Skyline Boulevards follow the top of the ridge. Many neighborhoods in the Berkeley Hills are home to the more affluent residents of Berkeley and Oakland.

The east slope of the Berkeley Hills is mostly preserved or partially developed wildland, much of it owned by the East Bay Regional Park District and the East Bay Municipal Utility District (EBMUD). From north to south, the parks are Wildcat Canyon Regional Park, Tilden Regional Park (includes Vollmer and Grizzly Peaks), Sibley Volcanic Regional Park (includes Round Top), Huckleberry Botanic Regional Preserve, Redwood Regional Park (enfolding Roberts Regional Recreation Area), Anthony Chabot Regional Park, Lake Chabot Regional Park, and Cull Canyon Regional Recreation Area. Claremont Canyon Regional Preserve, and Temescal Regional Park are lower on the western slopes while Las Trampas Regional Wilderness is lower on the eastern slope above Danville.

The Berkeley Hills are pierced by several tunnels. The four bores of the Caldecott Tunnel carry State Highway 24 between Oakland and Contra Costa County.

Usage
It is common to hear the term "Oakland Hills" to refer to that section of the Berkeley Hills that runs along the east side of Oakland. As a proper name or recognized toponym, it is technically incorrect. When used on maps, the exact south end of the "Berkeley Hills" is unclear, but the maps of the USGS show them stretching well south into the northeastern portion of Oakland.  It does not, in any case, correspond to any political boundaries, only to a geographic feature (much as "San Francisco Bay" is not limited to that stretch of the Pacific inlet within the bounds of the City and County of San Francisco).  The ridge extends south through Oakland and San Leandro to the drainage of San Leandro Creek called Castro Valley, and geologically, continues southward above the line of the Hayward Fault.  In the section above East Oakland to Castro Valley, the ridge appears on most maps as the San Leandro Hills.

The northern extent of the proper name "Berkeley Hills" is less indefinite; most maps including those of the USGS apply the name along the entire ridge as it runs continuously right up to the mouth of Wildcat Canyon in Richmond.  The eastern slopes of the Berkeley Hills lie entirely outside of the city of Berkeley within Contra Costa County.

Another common usage is East Bay Hills, but its application to any particular range is unclear.  It may refer to all of the ranges east of the Bay, from the Berkeley Hills to the Diablo Range and all the ranges between.

Ecology 
The Berkeley Hills are a region of great biological diversity as part of Pacific Coastal Region of California and the San Francisco Bay ecosystem. Much of the area is covered by grassland which favors the southwest facing slopes. Amongst the north east hills, Baccharis Brushland and Oak Woodland are most prominent with Coast live oak and California bay laurel as some of the most prolific trees. Past Eucalyptus tree farming during the early 20th century has also introduced large Eucalyptus groves scattered across the Berkeley Hills.

The area welcomes a wide variety of birds, lack-tailed deer, coyote, ground squirrel, striped skunk, western terrestrial garter snake, gray fox, bobcat, and red-tailed hawk. There are also periodic sightings of mountain lions amongst the Oak Woodland. Four protected species also call the Berkeley Hills their home, the San Francisco tree lupine moth, Alameda whipsnake, Callippe silverspot, and Bay checkerspot. Additionally, the grassland acts as an annual foraging spot for the northern harrier, American kestrel, prairie falcon, and turkey vulture.

Climatic effects

The Berkeley Hills affect the local climate by their elevation.  The oceanic marine layer, which develops during the summer, bringing fog and low clouds with it, is usually less than 2,000 feet deep and thus is blocked by the range.  This produces a "fog shadow" effect to the east, which is warmer than areas west of the hills.  The westerly wind that carries the marine layer through the Golden Gate typically splits its flow as it hits the Berkeley Hills producing a southerly wind from Berkeley northward and a northerly wind in the direction of Oakland.

In winter during spells of tule fog inland, a reverse situation occurs, with the fog usually confined to areas east of the hills, although occasionally, the inland fog pours in from the north, around the hills by way of the Carquinez Strait.

The Berkeley Hills affect rainfall; when the wind is perpendicular to the hills (southwest wind) during a storm, air is forced to rise, cooling and condensing additional moisture, increasing the precipitation on the western slopes and leaving areas east of the hills drier. Especially cold storms occasionally deposit wet snow on the peaks.

In spring and fall, sinking air from aloft combining with inland high pressure periodically sends the Diablo wind, a hot, dry, and gusty wind across the ridges of the Berkeley Hills, posing a fire danger, which in the 20th century produced several wildfires, two of which caused major damage to Berkeley and Oakland.  (See 1923 Berkeley Fire and 1991 Oakland firestorm).

References
Notes

Sources
 The California Earthquake of April 18, 1906: Report of the State Earthquake Investigation Commission, Andrew C. Lawson, chairman, Carnegie Institution of Washington Publication 87, 2 vols. (1908) - Available online at this USGS webpage.
 The Berkeley Hills, a Detail of Coast Range Geology, Andrew Cowper Lawson and Charles Palache, University of California Press, 1902
 Map of Oakland-Berkeley, California State Automobile Association, March 2006 edition
Plant Succession In The Berkeley Hills, California, 1974
The Berkeley Hills, a detail of Coast Range geology. Vol. 2. University of California Press, 1902.
Comparison Of The Influence Of Two Exotic Communities On Ecosystem Processes In The Berkeley Hills
 TopoZone Map
 Sibley Regional Preserve: Upper Tertiary East Bay Volcanism Exposed at Sibley Regional Preserve, Northern California Geological Society, 2018-2021.

 
California Coast Ranges
Hills of California
Mountain ranges of Alameda County, California
Mountain ranges of Contra Costa County, California
Geography of Berkeley, California
Geography of Oakland, California
El Cerrito, California
Mountain ranges of the San Francisco Bay Area
Mountain ranges of Northern California